The Passionate Canadians was a Canadian television documentary miniseries which aired on CBC Television in 1977.

Premise
This series profiles the Group of Seven and Tom Thomson, prominent Canadian artists of the early 20th century. The first hour features the artists during the 1910s, including their work in the Ontario wilderness and the effects of Thomson's 1917 death. The next part covers the following decade, with the formal establishment of the Group of Seven until its breakup in 1930. Production of the documentary was conducted over two years.

Scheduling
The two-part series was broadcast in hour-long episodes on 26 October and 2 November 1977. It was rebroadcast over a two-hour timeslot on 22 March 1981.

References

External links
 

CBC Television original programming
1977 Canadian television series debuts
1977 Canadian television series endings
1970s Canadian documentary television series